Frank Moran (1887–1967) was an American boxer and film actor.

Francis or Frank Moran may also refer to:

Francis Moran (cardinal) (1830–1911), Irish-born Roman Catholic Archbishop of Sydney
Francisco Morán (c. 1880–after 1911), known as Frank, Cuban outfielder and catcher
Frank Moran (footballer) (1883–1949), Australian rules player with Geelong
Francis D. Moran (born 1935), American scientist and officer of the NOAA Corps
Frank Moran (politician) (born 1968), American Democratic mayor of Camden, New Jersey
Frank A. Moran, American legislator in Massachusetts House of Representatives since 2013

See also 
William Francis Moran Jr. (1925–2006), American pioneering knifemaker, a/k/a Bill Moran
William Francis Moran (born 1958), American admiral
Frances Moran (1893–1977), Irish barrister and legal scholar, a/k/a Fran Moran